is a public university in Nago, Okinawa Prefecture, Japan. Meio was established as a private university in 1994 and was reorganized as a public university in 2010.

History
The university established the Liberal Arts Center in 2011, which was renamed as the “University Center for Liberal Arts Education” in 2015. The university also has several student support facilities that include the Language Learning Center, the Mathematics and Sciences Learning Center, and the Writing Center. The Graduate School of International Cultural Studies was established in 2001.

Undergraduate and Graduate School Programs
College of International Studies
International Culture
Language Education
Management
Information Systems
Health Information Management  
Tourism Industry 
Faculty of Human Health Sciences
Sports and Health Sciences
Nursing
Graduate School
Graduate School of International Cultural Studies
Graduate School of Nursing

Meio University has established international academic exchange programs with 23 universities in 14 countries. In addition, the university also offers many short-term study abroad programs. Japanese language courses from basic to advanced levels are offered. Exchange programs are offered with the following schools:

Brock University
Chung Chou University of Science and Technology
University of Malaya
George Fox University
Hasanuddin University
Hunan Agricultural University
Beijing Union University
Jeju National University
Kainan University
Keimyung University
Long Island University
Mae Fah Luang University
Manila University
Myongji University
National Autonomous University of Mexico
National University of Kaohsiung
Niagara University
San Martin de Porres
Shandong University
Siam University
Southeast Missouri State University
Springfield College
State University of Londrina
Tajen University
Universidad de Ciencias Empresariales y Sociales
Universidad del Pacifico
University of Central Lancashire
University of Guam
University of Hawaiʻi at Hilo
University of Hawaiʻi – West Oʻahu
University of Lethbridge
University of Wollongong
Vietnam National University

References

External links
Official website 

1994 establishments in Japan
Educational institutions established in 1994
Public universities in Japan
Universities and colleges in Okinawa Prefecture